Torellia delicata is a species of small sea snail, a marine gastropod mollusk in the family Capulidae, the cap snails.

Distribution

Description 
The maximum recorded shell length is 17 mm.

Habitat 
Minimum recorded depth is 156 m. Maximum recorded depth is 2100 m.

References

External links
  Serge GOFAS, Ángel A. LUQUE, Joan Daniel OLIVER,José TEMPLADO & Alberto SERRA (2021) - The Mollusca of Galicia Bank (NE Atlantic Ocean); European Journal of Taxonomy 785: 1–114

Capulidae
Gastropods described in 1844